French Pass is a small settlement just east of Cambridge in the Waikato Region of New Zealand. The settlement is named after the road pass from Cambridge through to Whitehall. There was a road through the pass by 1887.

References

Waipa District